The CANT 7 was a flying boat and training aircraft that was produced in Italy in the 1920s. It was a conventional biplane design with single-bay, unstaggered wings of equal span, with the single engine mounted below the upper wing. The aircraft was designed to prepare pilots for flying boat airliners, and most of the examples produced were purchased by Società Italiana Servizi Aerei for this purpose.

Operators

 Società Italiana Servizi Aerei (S.I.S.A.)

Specifications

See also

References

 
 aerei-italiani.net

cant 07
1920s Italian civil trainer aircraft
Flying boats
Biplanes
Single-engined pusher aircraft
Aircraft first flown in 1924